Wouldn't You Like It? is the third studio album by the Scottish pop rock group Bay City Rollers.  The LP, issued in the UK in late 1975, saw a marked change in the group's musical direction:  all the songs save one were the band's own compositions.  The one outside-written tune, "Give a Little Love", was a smash UK hit, and the only single released from the album. The album also included, in the form of a giant letter, a free color picture book of the individual members, with a band picture on the front.

Seven of the tracks from the album would appear on Arista Records' 1976 US-only album, Rock N'Roll Love Letter using the same cover photo and artwork.

Track listing

UK LP release, Bell Records #8002

Track listing per Discogs

2004 UK CD reissue
A 2004 CD reissue on Bell included four bonus tracks:  the smash hit "Saturday Night"; which had appeared on Japanese pressings of the original LP; "She'll Be Crying Over You" (originally the B-side of the UK "Give a Little Love" single); and two previously unissued tracks featuring early Roller Nobby Clark on lead vocal:  "Wouldn't You Like It? (1972 version)" and "I'd Do It Again".

Charts

Weekly charts

Year-end charts

Personnel
Les McKeown – lead and backing vocals
Stuart "Woody" Wood – guitars, backing vocals; co-lead vocals on "Shangai'd In Love"
Eric Faulkner – guitars, backing vocals; co-lead vocals on "Shangai'd In Love"
Alan Longmuir – bass, backing vocals; lead vocals on "Here Comes That Feeling Again"
Derek Longmuir – drums, backing vocals, percussion; spoken word on "Derek's End Piece"

Production
Recorded at:-
Chipping Norton Studios – Engineered by Dave Grinstead
Eden Studios, Chiswick – Engineered by Mike Gardener
Audio International Studios – Engineered by James Guthrie
Mastered at IBC Studios, London by Melvin Abrams
Musical Director – Colin Frechter
Produced by Phil Wainman
Sleeve design: The Green Bay Packers Art Company
Cover Photography: John Paul
Insert Photography: Alan Ballard
Art Director: John Dyer

References

Bay City Rollers albums
1975 albums
Albums produced by Phil Wainman
Bell Records albums